Pondville Cemetery, located on Everett Street, is one of the two oldest cemeteries in Norfolk, Massachusetts.  It was established c. 1757, when Norfolk was still part of Wrentham, and now abuts the town line of the two communities.  It was established to serve the residents of the Pondville village, which was first settled in the 1730s.  The cemetery is laid out on a series of terraces that rise from Everett Street to the west, with the oldest graves in the southwest corner, near the Wrentham line.  The oldest stones date to the early 19th century, and one of the most prominent markers is the c.1877 Victorian memorial to Captain Abijah Pond, an American Revolutionary War veteran.

The cemetery was listed on the National Register of Historic Places in 2014.

See also
 National Register of Historic Places listings in Norfolk County, Massachusetts

References

External links
 

Cemeteries on the National Register of Historic Places in Massachusetts
National Register of Historic Places in Norfolk County, Massachusetts
1757 establishments in the Thirteen Colonies